The Seven Balls is a Grade-II-listed public house at Kenton Lane, Harrow Weald, London.

The timber-framed building is probably 17th century, but with later additions.

The pub has recently undergone a renovation which was completed in June 2019 and has been re-branded as The Seven Harrow.

References

Grade II listed buildings in the London Borough of Harrow
Grade II listed pubs in London
Pubs in the London Borough of Harrow
Timber framed buildings in London